Water Street Music Hall is a 1,000 capacity concert venue in Rochester, New York, located in the St. Paul Quarter. WSMH is divided into two spaces; the main hall and The Club at Water St., which is a 500 capacity room for local and regional bands. Both performance spaces offer a full sound system, stage, lights, with a balcony view and hold the reputation as legendary live rooms in western NY. Water Street Music Hall has been open in one form or another for forty years.

History
Water Street Music Hall opened in 1999 and has since hosted hundreds of iconic concerts throughout the past 20+ years with artists including George Clinton and Parliament Funkadelic, David Byrne, Portugal. The Man, Fall Out Boy, Coheed and Cambria, Minus The Bear, Sublime, St. Vincent, and so many more. Sept. 27, 1991 Phish played at 204 N. Water Street which was called The Warehouse at the time. Previously known as The Country Warehouse and The Horizontal Boogie Bar which opened in 1976, the name officially changed to Water Street Music Hall in 1999. WSMH was home to hundreds of sold-out shows between 2000 and 2014.

Following an increased trend of incidents occurring outside of Water Street Music Hall, the tenant at that time decided to sell his business. While it reopened temporarily under a provisional licence from the city, it ultimately resulted in the sale of the business to Syracuse chain, Funk 'N Waffles in February 2017.

As of 2022, Water Street Music Hall has reopened under new ownership and has resumed hosting iconic shows both in the hall and club sides of the venue. Recent shows have included national touring artists such as Jack Harlow, Pusha T, and King Gizzard and the Lizard Wizard.

References

External links

Entertainment venues in Rochester, New York
Music of Rochester, New York
1991 establishments in New York (state)